Rear-Admiral Rashid Ahmed (Urdu:رشيد احمد; b. 1918–2005), was a two-star rank admiral in the Pakistan Navy, who is known for serving as Chief of Staff under Commander in Chief Vice-Admiral Muzaffar Hassan and led the Navy during the fateful events in the war with India in 1971.

Biography

Rashid Ahmed was born in British India and joined the Royal Indian Navy (RIN) in 1938 where he participated in the World War II in Burma' theatre. He was stationed in the Andaman and Nicobar Island, and served against the Imperial Japanese Navy in Burma in 1944–45.

After the World War II, he was sent to attend the Britannia Royal Naval College in 1945–47, where he specialized in technical courses, and returned to India. At the time of his transfer to Pakistan Navy, he was serving in the Executive Branch with the rank of Lieutenant-Commander, with service number PN.12. After the partition of India, he was sent to the United Kingdom to attend the Joint Service Defence College in 1949–51, and returned to take command assignment at the Navy NHQ in Karachi, at that time. In 1952–56, Lt.Cdr Ahmed served and later commanded the PNS Tariq and did a tour to Suez Canal before returning.

In 1960s, Captain Rashid Ahmed served was the DCNS (Operations), and participated in the second war with India in 1965. In 1967–69, Commodore Ahmed briefly tenured as the managing-director of the National Shipping Corporation and subsequently left the post. In 1969, Rear-Admiral Rashid Ahmed was moved to Navy NHQ, and appointed as Chief of Staff under Commander in Chief Vice-Admiral Muzaffar Hassan. In 1971, he visited China to hold talks in procuring defence equipments for the Navy, along with Lieutenant-General Gul Hassan Khan.

As Chief of Staff, he led the Pakistan Navy during the fateful events in the against the Indian Navy, and after the signed surrender went into effect that marked the succession of East-Pakistan as Bangladesh, Rear-Admiral Ahmed was among the highest flag ranking officer, who were superseded by their juniors, for the command assignments. In April 1972, Rear-Admiral Ahmed was forcefully retired from his service. After his retirement, he worked for the National Shipping Corporation and the Pakistan State Oil as its managing-director in 1980s, and subsequently lived a quiet life in Islamabad, passing away in 2005.

References

1918 births
2005 deaths
Military personnel from Lucknow
Muhajir people
Indian military personnel of World War II
Royal Indian Navy officers
Pakistan Navy officers
Pakistani chief executives
Pakistan Navy admirals
Pakistani military personnel of the Indo-Pakistani War of 1971
Admirals of the Indo-Pakistani War of 1971
People from Islamabad